The Ranks of the Imperial Japanese Navy were the rank insignia of the Imperial Japanese Navy, used from its creation in 1868, until its dissolution in 1945 following the Surrender of Japan in World War II. The ranks were inspired by the ranks of the Royal Navy.

Thus, for example, a captain in the navy shared the same rank designation as that of a colonel in the army:  (colonel), so the rank of  denoted an army colonel, while the rank of  denoted a naval captain.

Commissioned officer ranks

Ranks
All commissioned officer rank names were the same as their army counterparts. The navy would prefix the common rank names with "navy", while the army would prefix them with "army". There was a minor difference in pronunciation of character  for Navy Lieutenant and Navy Captain. However, this pronunciation difference was not officially enacted.

Regular Officers were graduates of Imperial Japanese Naval Academy. Reserve Officers were university or college graduates, as opposed to going through the naval academy. Special Duty Officers were the officers with the rank of Lieutenant or below, who were promoted from the rank of Warrant Officer (starting from the enlisted ranks). Typically the ranks discriminated in a way that the priority of taking command for Special Duty Officers was lower than that of Regular Officers or Reserve Officers. The distinction between Special Duty Officers and Regular/Reserve Officers was also highlighted in the rank insignia (see the table for details).

The rank Commodore was not established but the Captain who was commanding the central ship in the fleet, usually close to being promoted to the rank of Rear-Admiral, or acting as the unit commander (which was usually held by a Rear-Admiral) nominally became a flag officer by raising the "Commodore Flag".

Rank flags

Cadet and warrant officer ranks
Midshipman and Warrant Officer's collar insignia are the same (both were treated as officer-equivalent), but in detail, the midshipman's position is above Warrant Officer. Furthermore, midshipman rank was not via commissioned, but it was via ordered or warranted. Cadet is much more likely to be classified as slightly higher than a non-commissioned officer, since the cap's line is only one, compared to the commissioned officer's cap which has two lines and the type 3 uniform is based on the enlisted personnel.

See the table below for details regarding the cadet/WO ranks and insignia:

Non-commissioned officer and enlisted personnel rates
For seamen and petty officers, which were selected from enlisted men or conscripts and given training in the Navy's service/technical school, the names were different from the army names but were equal in rank. Different service branches within the navy had their specialisation augment the common rank name. For example, Imperial Japanese Navy Air Service (IJNAF) had "Flight" (飛行 Hikō) incorporated into the common rank name, such as Flight Petty Officer First Class or Flight Seaman Second Class (二等飛行兵 Nitō-hikō-hei). For practical use, these rank names were often shortened to 一飛曹 (Ippisō) or 二飛 (Nihi), respectively. The enlisted rank insignia were changed in April 1942 and the common rank names were updated in November 1942.

The enlisted insignia prior to changes in 1942 was a round patch that contained one anchor for the lowest grade, two crossed anchors for the middle grade and two crossed anchors with a cherry blossom for the highest grade. The petty officer insignia followed the same pattern but additionally had wreaths. The insignia was red on black background for winter dark-blue uniforms (also for flight suits), black on white background for summer white uniforms, and red on green background for Special Naval Landing Forces (SNLF) uniforms. The anchor would be replaced by different symbols for specialised branches; for example, aviation had an aircraft instead. After the changes in 1942, the insignia was a black patch that was square-shaped on the top and arrow-shaped on the bottom. Inside the patch, all branches had a yellow anchor and one yellow horizontal stripe for the lowest grade, two for the middle grade and three for the highest grade. Similarly as before, the petty officer insignia followed the same pattern but additionally had wreaths. For all ranks there was also a cherry blossom in the middle, which changed its colour based on the branch; for example, light blue represented aviation.

Service branch colours
The branch of the Navy in which non-executive personnel served was indicated by a colour code. For officers, including midshipmen, it was the colour of cloth placed as background to the cuff stripes, on both sides of the gold lace on the shoulder boards, and as longitudinal piping on the collar patches. Midshipmen and cadets wore a coloured anchor on the cap, which cadets wore on the shoulder boards as well. The branch of enlisted men was denoted by the colour of the cherry blossom flower on their rank patch; line personnel using the default gold.

See also
 Ranks of the Imperial Japanese Army
 Recruitment in the Imperial Japanese Navy
 Pilot training in the Imperial Japanese Navy

Notes

References

Bibliography 

 
 
 
 
 
 
 
 
 
 
 

Ranks
Military ranks of Japan
Military history of Japan during World War II
Military insignia

ja:日本軍と自衛隊の階級#海軍
vi:Quân hàm của Quân đội Đế quốc Nhật Bản